Joakim Holmquist (born 15 March 1969) is a former Swedish Olympic freestyle swimmer. He competed in the 4×100 m freestyle team in the 1988 Summer Olympics finishing 5th.

Clubs
Jönköpings SS

References

1969 births
Living people
Swimmers at the 1988 Summer Olympics
Olympic swimmers of Sweden
European Aquatics Championships medalists in swimming
Jönköpings SS swimmers
Swedish male freestyle swimmers